Li Shengwu (1899–1985) was a Chinese politician and diplomat of the Republic of China who later became an important figure of the Wang Jingwei Government of Wang Jingwei.

Biography 
He was born in Tai'an, Shandong Province, during the late Qing Dynasty. Li graduated from the law school at Peking National University and later studied abroad in Japan, at the law school of Tokyo Imperial University, and at Oxford University in the UK. He became a professor at Fudan University upon returning to China. In 1932, Li started working for the Nationalist government and in December of that year he served as a member of the Ministry of Foreign Affairs chief administrative office. In 1935, he joined the Hong Kong Institute of International Affairs. It was at that time that Li became acquainted with Wang Jingwei. In June 1937 he returned to work in the foreign ministry.

In 1940, Li joined the Japanese-sponsored Reorganized National Government of China, led by Wang, as a high-ranking official of the judicial department and a member of the Kuomintang (Wang Jingwei faction) central committee. He was also appointed to various other government committees. In September 1941 he was appointed as the ambassador to Germany. In 1942, he was also made as minister to Denmark in addition to his role as the ambassador to Germany, but was unable to travel to either country to take up his posts. In April 1945, he was named the Minister of Foreign Affairs and appointed to various other government bodies.

Following the defeat of Japan in August 1945, he was arrested by Chiang Kai-shek's government and imprisoned in Nanjing. In 1947 he received a sentence of 15 years in prison. However, Li was later released and retired in Hong Kong, where he taught law and Chinese literature. From 1984, he lived in Jiamusi, in the People's Republic of China, with his eldest daughter. Li died in 1985.

Sources 
Xu Xiang. People Dictionary of Korea Revised Edition. Hebei People's Publishing Company, 2007. .
Yu Zidao (余子道) (etc.) (2006). The Complete History of Wang's Fake Regime (汪伪政权全史). Shanghai People's Press (Shanghai Renmin Chubanshe; 上海人民出版社). .
Liu Shoulin (刘寿林) (etc.ed.) (1995). The Chronological Table of the Republic's Officer (民国职官年表). Zhonghua Book Company. .

1899 births
1985 deaths
Ambassadors of China to Germany
Ambassadors of China to Denmark
Chinese collaborators with Imperial Japan
Kuomintang collaborators with Imperial Japan
Chinese diplomats
Alumni of the University of Oxford
Republic of China politicians from Shandong
National University of Peking alumni